Benoît-Marie Langénieux (born 15 October 1824 at Villefranche-sur-Saône, Rhône – 1 January 1905 at Reims) was a French Archbishop of Reims and Cardinal.

Biography

He studied humanities in Paris at St-Nicolas du Chardonnet, under Félix Dupanloup; and theology at St-Sulpice, where he was ordained, 1850. After nine years as curate at St-Roch, he became successively diocesan promoter 1859; curé of St-Ambroise, 1863; then of St-Augustin, 1868; Vicar-General of Paris, and archdeacon of Notre-Dame in 1871. 

Made Bishop of Tarbes in 1873, he was in the following year translated to the archiepiscopal See of Reims. The thirty-one years of his episcopate were fruitful ones. Beside obtaining from the French legislature an appropriation of two millions of francs for the restoration of Reims cathedral, he secured for the Trappists the ancient Abbey of Igny, and for the Oratorians the priory of Binson, and erected at Châtillon the colossal statue of Pope Urban II, whose cultus he had promoted in Rome. He built in the suburbs of his metropolis the churches of Ste-Geneviève, St-Jean-Baptiste de La Salle, St-Benoit, and Ste-Clothilde, this latter being afterwards made the seat of an archconfraternity of prayer for France, and the place of celebration of the fourteenth centenary of Clovis's baptism. When the law of school secularization came into effect, he filled his see with Catholic schools and founded four asylums for orphans. 

Created cardinal in 1886, he presided as papal legate over the Eucharistic Congresses of Jerusalem, Reims, and Lourdes.

He took an active part in the beatification of Joan of Arc. He fought the anti-religious legislation that was being prepared against Christian education, the religious institutes, and the concordat. His "Déclaration des Cardinaux et exposé de la situation faite à l'Église de France" (1892), and his "Lettre au Président de la République" (1904), remain as witnesses to his  character. 

He cherished above all the title of "Cardinal des ouvriers" given him by the gratitude of the working class, whose interests, spiritual and material, he never ceased to champion. Langénieux enjoyed the friendship of Pope Leo XIII, who consulted him on all matters concerning the Church in France. The universal esteem in which he was held was abundantly proved by the many decorations which European rulers bestowed on him and by the vast concourse of bishops, priests, and people at his two jubilees and at his funeral. His eulogy was pronounced by Gaspard-Marie-Michel-André Latty, Bishop of Châlons-sur-Marne, and Bishop Touchet, of Orléans. 

Beside the pamphlets mentioned above and a number of occasional discourses, we have from Langénieux's pen: eight pastoral letters (Tarbes, 1873); 231 mandements (Reims, 1874–1905); and "Abregé de l'Histoire de la Religion" (Paris, 1874).

He participated in the conclave of 1903, which elected Pope Pius X.

References

Sources
Frezel, Son Eminence le Cardinal Langénieux (Reims, 1905)
Frezel, in L'Episcopat francais (Paris, 1907), under Tarbes, and Reims 
Compans, Son Eminence le Cardinal Langénieux (Reims, 1887)
La France chrétienne à Reims en 1896 (Paris, 1896).

1824 births
1905 deaths
People from Villefranche-sur-Saône
19th-century French cardinals
Cardinals created by Pope Leo XIII
Archbishops of Reims
Bishops of Tarbes
20th-century French cardinals